Electrosexual is a French electronic musician, composer, performer, record producer and music video director living in Berlin.

Career
Electrosexual's passion for early electronic engines and primitive sounds from analog synthesizers inspired his mingling rough bass with an uptempo rhythm. He is the electro-sex (sometimes called sex-tronica) precursor and pioneer in France.
He is an advocate of LGBT rights.

Electrosexual created his stage name in reference to surrealistic non "(human) sexuality", considering machines and synthesizers as genitors, following in the footsteps of David Cronenberg, H.R. Giger, Chris & Cosey and Add N to (X).

In the summer of 2005, after a show in Berlin (Sage Club/Plastique party) where he performed for the first time as a solo act, his song "Trapped Inside" was selected to be released on the fifth anniversary compilation of the cult Berlin record label Das Drehmoment.

The same year, Electrosexual created his own record label, Rock Machine Records (named after the French title of  Norman Spinrad's novel Little Heroes), as an independent platform for electronic music, parties organizing and performances.

Electrosexual offered production for the American queer hip hop duo Scream Club, mixing electronic dance music with gender issues themed lyrics and club performances.
Their first songs, one of which features vocals by Peaches, would be the very first vinyl to be released on Rock Machine in 2006. They collaborated and played live together for the next years and released two more EPs: "Break You nice/ Screaming & Crying" Featuring Shunda K was released in 2010 as a limited edition on white vinyl, including remixes by Hard Ton, Leonard De Leonard and Divider. The video for the single "Break You Nice" was the first directed by Electrosexual and was broadcast on MTV and VH1 for several months.

The same year, Shunda K of Yo Majesty asked Electrosexual to co-produce her first solo single "Here I Am To Save The World" (2010, Fanatic Records).

In March and April 2010, Electrosexual and Scream Club were the support act for Robots in Disguise on their "Wake Up Tour" in the UK. They performed the "Wake Up" Electrosexual & Scream Club Remix as an encore.

Sue Denim of the Robots in Disguise recorded vocals for Electrosexual's EP "Partytime" featuring Scream Club, released as a Digi-EP, with remixes by aMinus and French hip hop artist Flore.

At the end of 2010, Electrosexual released "I Feel Love" that quickly became an underground club hit. The song was referred to as "a disco neo classic" and "best song of the year 2012" by the blogosphere.

Electrosexual has remixed material by other artists, including Billie Ray Martin and Aérea Negrot, David Carretta's "Lovely Toy", Transformer Di Roboter's "Baghdad Disco", I Monster’s "Sucker For Your Sound", Mirah’s "Cold Cold Water", Ssion’s "Ah-Ma", Peaches featuring Scream Club "Fine As Fuck".

He composed the official themes for the 2011 and 2012 "Ecrans Mixtes" LGBTQ movie festivals in Lyons, where he also performed.

Electrosexual performed at events including the Waves festival in Vienna, the Paradiso, at Paris's Le Pigallion and La Machine du Moulin Rouge or in Berlin's Prince Charles and Berghain Kantine, SO36 and presented a sound and video installation at Berghain in 2015.

After a series of single and EPs with various guest vocalists, in 2014, Electrosexual released his debut full LP Art Support Machine, a mixture of retro-futuristic analogue electronics and kaleidoscopic synths. The album is influenced by 1980s synth pop, techno and 1990s trance. Only four tracks are instrumental on the LP.

Art Support Machine explores the Machine as the supreme vision of the human condition, and is focusing on the concept of the identity of the Machines, their gender, sexuality and soul.

The 2014 single "The way they make you feel" received a special 9/10 mention by Mixmag magazine.

Production and equipment 

Electrosexual is currently known for the strong use of analog synthesizers in his music. He stated in an interview with Add N to (X) front woman Ann Shenton for Zoot Magazine, that he uses the Korg MS-10/MS-20, Moog Rogue, Yamaha CS 5 and Roland JX-3P. Additional gear includes the Ensoniq DP4+ and multi-effects pedals.

Discography

Albums

Singles and EPs

Remixes 
 Sherø – "Berlin Moon"(Electrosexual remix) KlubKid Records
 Sky Deep – "I Did It"(Electrosexual remix) Reveller Records
 Millimetric – "Deflection"(Electrosexual remix) Nu Body Records
 Rituel – "Dreams"(Electrosexual remix)
 Plasticzooms – "Quite Cleary"(Electrosexual remix) Vinyl Junkie Records
 Autist – "Chien"(Electrosexual remix)[unreleased]
 Plasticzooms – "Veiled Eyes"(Electrosexual remix)
 Billie Ray Martin & Aérea Negrot – "Off The Rails"(Electrosexual remix)
 Billie Ray Martin & Aérea Negrot – "Off The Rails"(Electrosexual dub)
 Ost + Front – "MNSTR" – (Electrosexual remix) Out Of Line Records
 Adan & Ilse – "Like Me" – (Electrosexual remix) Unknown Pleasures Records
 Autist – "Low Passion"(Electrosexual remix)
 Lois Plugged & Fruckie – "Spleen" – (Electrosexual remix) Boxon Records
 aMinus – "Morning After thrill" – (Electrosexual remix)
 Fantôme – "Love" (Electrosexual remix) Cleopatra records/Rough Trade
 Dualesque – "Uncomplicated" (Electrosexual Complicated remix)
 Desireless & Operation of the Sun – "Sertao" (Electrosexual remix)
 Tubbe – "Liebe Fertig" (Electrosexual remix) Audiolith Records
 aMinus Feat Magritte Jaco – "Don't Mind Me now" (Electrosexual remix)
 Hedi Mohr – "Little Red" Feat. Red Noise(Electrosexual remix) Black Mink Rec
 Tkuz – "In The Box" (Electrosexual remix) Black Leather
 Dead Sexy Inc. – "Lonesome Poupée" (Electrosexual remix + Le Bardot remix)
 Equitant – "Body Vehement" (Electrosexual remix) Black Montanas
 The Niallist – "Work It" (Electrosexual remix)
 Steve Morell & Monika Pokorna – "Lady Pheres" (Electrosexual remix) Pale Music International
 Peaches Feat Shunda K. – "Billionaire" (Electrosexual remix)
 Transformer di Roboter – "Baghdad Disco" (Electrosexual remix) Leonizer Records
 Vesto Caino – "Dolce Vita" (Electrosexual remix) Sony/Columbia
 Minor Sailor – "Doctor Said" (Electrosexual remix) Les Boutiques Sonores
 Robots in Disguise – "Wake Up" (Electrosexual remix) President Records
 Fil Ok – "Listen To Me" (Electrosexual remix) OK Music
 I Monster – "Sucker for Your Sound" (Electrosexual remix) Twins of Evil Records
 Ssion – "Ah-Ma" (Electrosexual remix) Sleazetone Records
 Candy Clash – "79" (Electrosexual remix) Sister Records
 Keen K & P Muench – "Connection Flight" (Electrosexual Radionnection) Perfect Stranger Records
 Dusti – "New York Slaves" (Electrosexual Slavery) Rock Machine Records
 Mirah – "Cold Cold Water" (Electrosexual & Abberline remix) K Records
 David Carretta – "Lovely Toy" (Electrosexual remix) Space Factory disques
 Punk Bunny – "Next Caller" & "G-Spot" (Electrosexual remix) Crunch Records
 Lesbians on Ecstasy – "Tell Me Does She Love the Bass" (Electrosexual remix) Alien8 Recordings
 Houston Bernard "Str8 Acting" – (Electrosexual remix) MOFA Schallplatten

DJ mixes 
 The Acid Tape (Rock Machine Records)
 The Beat Tape (Rock Machine Records)
 Art Support Mixtape (Track listings 2.0)
 The Wrangeltape (Wrangelkiez)
 Long Live The New Flesh (Novafuture Blog)
 The Razortape, Vol. 1 (Rock Machine Records)
 The VogueTape, Vol. 2 (Rock Machine Records)
 The VogueTape, Vol. 1 (Rock Machine Records)
 The Rock Machine Mix Series, Vol. 1 (Rock Machine Records)

Filmography

References

External links 
 Electrosexual Official Site
 
 Music on Bandcamp Bandcamp
 The method and the formula behind the sonic experiments of Romain Frequency Interview on Four Culture Magazine
 Facebook Electrosexual Facebook Page

French record producers
French dance musicians
Intelligent dance musicians
Club DJs
Living people
Remixers
French DJs
German LGBT singers
French pop musicians
LGBT directors
Musicians from Toulouse
Electronica musicians
French electronic musicians
Electronic music singers
French pop singers
1980 births
French keyboardists
French LGBT singers
Queer musicians
French film directors
Musical groups established in 2004
French male artists
Electronic dance music DJs
LGBT DJs